1. FC Lübars is a German sport club from Lübars. The club was founded 1962 and competes in football. The club is most known for its women's football section. The mens team currently competes in the Bezirksliga Berlin 1, the eight level in the German football league system.

Women's football 
The club opened its women's football section in 1971. In 2009, the women's section signed a cooperation with Hertha BSC to represent them in the women competitions, including 2. Bundesliga and DFB–Pokal. They were the champion of the 2014–15 2. Bundesliga (women), but since they failed to get a license to play in the Bundesliga (women), they were not granted a promotion. Due to financial issues, they lost their 2. Bundesliga license and got relegated. They were planned to compete in the BerlinLiga, but also later on pulled out. They will start football activities again in 2017, by competing in the Bezirksliga.

Current squad

Former players

Honours 
 2. Bundesliga
 Winner: 2014–15
 Regionalliga Nordost
 Winner: 1992–93

Recent seasons

References

External links 
 

 
Football clubs in Germany
Lübars
Association football clubs established in 1962
1962 establishments in Germany
Football clubs in Berlin